KONY, branded as "99.9 KONY Country", is a Country formatted radio station broadcasting to the St. George, Cedar City area.  The station, whose frequency is 99.9 MHz, is owned and operated by Canyon Media.

On-air personalities include Carl LaMar, the return of Marty Lane with Amy Chesley.

References

External links

Country radio stations in the United States
ONY
Cedar City, Utah